Schulting is a Dutch surname.

People with this surname:
Harry Schulting (born 1956), Dutch track and field athlete
Peter Schulting (born 1987), Dutch cyclist
Suzanne Schulting (born 1997), Dutch short track speed skater

Dutch-language surnames

nl:Schulting